Jalilabad Rural District is in Jalilabad District of Pishva County, Tehran province, Iran. At the National Census of 2006, its constituent villages were in the former Pishva District of Varamin County. There were 7,300 inhabitants in 1,958 households at the following census of 2011, by which time the district had been separated from the county and Pishva County established. At the most recent census of 2016, the population of the rural district was 6,960 in 1,992 households. The largest of its nine villages was Jalilabad, with 5,216 people.

References 

Pishva County

Rural Districts of Tehran Province

Populated places in Tehran Province

Populated places in Pishva County